Contoocook Lake is a  water body located in Cheshire County in southwestern New Hampshire, United States, in the towns of Jaffrey and Rindge. The lake, along with Pool Pond, forms the headwaters of the Contoocook River, which flows north to the Merrimack River in Penacook, New Hampshire.

The lake is classified as a warmwater fishery, with observed species including largemouth bass, smallmouth bass, white perch, yellow perch, black crappie, bluegill, pumpkinseed, chain pickerel, and horned pout.

See also

List of lakes in New Hampshire

References

Lakes of Cheshire County, New Hampshire
Jaffrey, New Hampshire
Rindge, New Hampshire
New Hampshire placenames of Native American origin